Dustin Brown and Rogier Wassen were the defending champions but they decided not to participate together.
Wassen played alongside Björn Phau, while Brown partnered up with Ken Skupski. They all were eliminated in the quarterfinals.

Marcin Gawron and Andriej Kapaś won this tournament. They defeated Andrey Golubev and Yuri Schukin 6–3, 6–4 in the final.

Seeds

Draw

Draw

References
 Main Draw

Pekao Szczecin Open - Doubles
2011 Doubles
2011 in Polish sport